Manzur Qadir (28 November 1913 – 12 October 1974) was a Pakistani jurist and politician who served as the Foreign Minister of Pakistan in the military government of Ayub Khan from 1958 to 1962. Manzur Qadir served as the Chief Justice of Lahore High Court from 1962–1963.

He was the son of Sir Abdul Qadir. He married a daughter of Fazli Husain, a political leader of Punjab, British India.  After his demise, his associate Ijaz Husain Batalvi  annually organized Mazur Qadir memorial lectures attended by hundred of thousands lawyers and judges, this practice was continued by his associate Akhtar Aly Kureshy for Ijaz Husain Batalvi memorial.

In 1962, Qadir served as the chairman of the constitutional committee which eventually formulated Constitution of Pakistan of 1962.

View of tolerance and respect
Qadir was a role-model to and a friend of  Khushwant Singh - a famous journalist and editor in India. Both friends shared a common worldview of tolerance and mutual respect. In February 2015, this view was endorsed by a panel of guests on a TV show including late Khushwant Singh's son Rahul Singh, Pakistani Senator Aitezaz Ahsan, an Indian writer Shobha De and the son of Manzur Qadir - Basharat Qadir. Basharat Qadir related how Khushwant Singh handed over the keys of his house in Lahore to Manzur Qadir at the time of Partition of British India in 1947 before he left for India.

References

1913 births
1974 deaths
Foreign Ministers of Pakistan
Pakistani jurists
Chief Justices of the Lahore High Court
Justices of the Supreme Court of Pakistan